Igor Liba (born November 4, 1960, in Prešov, Czechoslovakia) is a Slovak former professional ice hockey player, who played on the 1992 Bronze Medal-winning Olympic Hockey team for Czechoslovakia, and lives in Košice, Slovakia.

Igor Liba was inducted into the Slovak Hockey Hall of Fame in 2005.

Career
Igor Liba played for ZPA Prešov (1970–1978), HC Košice (1978–1982, 1984–1988, 1991–1992, 1997–1998 and 1998–1999) and HC Dukla Jihlava (1982–1984) in Czechoslovakia, after 1993 in Slovakia mostly for HK VTJ Spišská Nová Ves.

In 1983 he was drafted by the Calgary Flames. Played with the New York Rangers (10 games, 2 goals + 5 assists) and Los Angeles Kings (37 games, 7 goals + 18 assists) in the season of 1988–1989. In the Los Angeles Kings he was playing with Wayne Gretzky in one formation. 
 
He also played for EHC Biel - Switzerland, :it:Hockey Club Fiemme - Italy, TuTo Turku - Finland, HK VTJ Spišská Nová Ves - Slovakia, HK VTJ Trebišov - Slovakia, HC Zeltweg - Austria and HK Dragon Prešov - Slovakia.

Career statistics

Regular season and playoffs

International

External links

 Igor Liba in the Slovak Hockey Hall of Fame
 Official website of HC Košice

1960 births
Living people
Calgary Flames draft picks
Czechoslovak expatriate sportspeople in Italy
Czechoslovak expatriate sportspeople in Switzerland
Czechoslovak expatriate sportspeople in the United States
Czechoslovak ice hockey left wingers
EHC Biel players
HC Dukla Jihlava players
HC Fiemme Cavalese players
HC Košice players
HK Spišská Nová Ves players
Ice hockey players at the 1984 Winter Olympics
Ice hockey players at the 1988 Winter Olympics
Ice hockey players at the 1992 Winter Olympics
Los Angeles Kings players
Medalists at the 1984 Winter Olympics
Medalists at the 1992 Winter Olympics
New York Rangers players
Olympic bronze medalists for Czechoslovakia
Olympic ice hockey players of Czechoslovakia
Olympic medalists in ice hockey
Olympic silver medalists for Czechoslovakia
Sportspeople from Prešov
Slovak ice hockey left wingers
TuTo players
Czechoslovak expatriate ice hockey people
Slovak expatriate sportspeople in Austria
Expatriate ice hockey players in Austria
Slovak expatriate ice hockey players in Finland
Expatriate ice hockey players in Italy